Kendji "Girac" Jason Maillié (born July 3, 1996), also known mononymously as Kendji, is a French singer-songwriter. He is the winner of season 3 of the music competition The Voice: la plus belle voix as part of Team Mika. He has released five studio albums, Kendji, Ensemble, Amigo, Mi Vida and L'école de la vie as well as a string of hit singles.

Biography

Beginnings
The youngest of a Catalan Gitano family, Kendji grew up in Saint-Astier and was taught to play the guitar and sing by his grandfather. He left school at 16 to follow the family business as an arborist. He speaks Catalan with his parents. He gained some fame through publishing materials online. His Romanes version of "Bella" by Maître Gims filmed by a friend went viral. His video garnered 5.8 million views. Another popular song he uploaded was "Si j'étais président" a cover of Gérard Lenorman.

The Voice
For season 3 of The Voice: la plus belle voix, he auditioned with the song "Bella" by Maître Gims in the second episode of season 3 broadcast on January 18, with only judge Mika turning his chair, whereas the three others, Florent Pagny, Jenifer and Garou refrained.

In the Musical Battles Round broadcast on 8 March 2014, Mika put him against Youness both singing "Tous les mêmes" by Stromae. Kendji moved to "L'épreuve ultime" round where he performed "Hotel California by The Eagles in the 29 March 2014 emission. 
 
In the live rounds he performed "Ma philosophie" by Amel Bent (5 April 2014), "Mad World" from Tears for Fears (19 April 2014) and "Allumer le feu" by Johnny Hallyday (19 April 2014). In the semi-final on 3 May 2014 he sang "Belle" by Garou and Daniel Lavoie qualifying for the finals as Team Mika's finalist.

In the final broadcast on Final, on 10 May 2014, he sang "Amor de mis amores" / "Volare" by Gipsy Kings, "Temps à nouveau" by Jean-Louis Aubert and "L'Aigle noir" by Barbara. He won The Voice title for season 3 with 51% of the public vote against 21% for runner up Maximilien Philippe, with Amir Haddad finishing third with 18% and Wesley with only 10% fourth.

Career

His first official single the bilingual French/Spanish "Color Gitano", which was released in June 2014 from his eponymous EP, followed by his official album release in September. In December 2014, he won two NRJ Music Awards for Francophone Breakthrough of the Year and "Color Gitano" as Francophone Song of the Year. His album Kendji sold 600,000 copies by January 2015, and over 1 million copies by October 2015, certifying Diamond and becoming France's second highest selling album of 2014 after Racine carrée by Stromae. He is currently the biggest selling The Voice alumnus worldwide. His follow-up single "Andalouse" proved even more successful commercially. Other notable singles included "Conmigo" from the repackaged version of Kendji released on 4 May 2015.

A second album titled Ensemble was released on 30 October 2015. Notable singles from his second album include "Me Quemo", "Les yeux de la mama" and "No Me Mirès Màs" (jointly with Soprano).

On 31 August 2018 his third album, titled Amigo was released. It started at number one on the French sales chart with 48,408 sales.

On 22 August 2020 he joined the cast of The Voice Kids France, becoming the first French former contestant to join the jury of the French franchise of the show, alongside Jenifer, Patrick Fiori and Soprano.

Charity work 
In 2017, Kendji joined the Enfoirés, a team of high-grossing artists involved in the hugely popular charity mission Restos du Coeur, which hosts yearly concerts to raise money for one of France's most respected soup kitchen networks.

Discography

Studio albums

Live albums

Other album releases

EPs

Singles

As lead artist

*Did not appear in the official Belgian Ultratop 50 charts, but rather in the bubbling under Ultratip charts.

As featured artist

Other charted songs

*Did not appear in the official Belgian Ultratop 50 charts, but rather in the bubbling under Ultratip charts.

Awards

Filmography 
 2017: Chacun sa vie et son intime conviction

References

External links

Official website

People from Périgueux
1995 births
Living people
MTV Europe Music Award winners
The Voice (franchise) winners
Spanish-language singers of France
French people of Romani descent
French Romani people
French folk-pop singers
21st-century French singers
21st-century French male singers